The 2014 Internazionali di Tennis Castel del Monte was a professional tennis tournament played on indoor carpet courts. It was the second edition of the tournament which is part of the 2014 ATP Challenger Tour. It took place in Andria, Italy between November 15 and November 23, 2014.

Singles main-draw entrants

Seeds

 1 Rankings are as of November 10, 2014.

Other entrants
The following players received wildcards into the singles main draw:
  Filippo Baldi
  Matteo Berrettini
  Matteo Donati
  Pietro Licciardi

The following players received entry from the qualifying draw:
  Mirza Bašić
  Alessandro Bega
  Nicolas Reissig
  Anton Zaitcev

The following players received entry by a lucky loser spot:
  Andriej Kapaś
  Yannick Maden
  Nikola Mektić

The following player received entry by an alternate spot: 
  Konstantin Kravchuk

The following player received entry by a protected ranking:
  Sergei Bubka

Champions

Singles

  Ričardas Berankis def.  Nikoloz Basilashvili, 6–4, 1–0, ret.

Doubles

  Patrick Grigoriu /  Costin Pavăl def.  Roman Jebavý /  Andreas Siljeström, 7–6(7–4), 6–7(4–7), [10–5]

External links
Official Website

Internazionali di Tennis Castel del Monte
Internazionali di Tennis Castel del Monte
2014 in Italian tennis